Judge Beatty may refer to:

George Beatty (judge) (fl. 1970s–2020s), provincial judge of the Ontario Court of Justice
James H. Beatty (1836–1927), judge of the United States District Court for the District of Idaho
William L. Beatty (1925–2001), judge of the United States District Court for the Southern District of Illinois

See also
James A. Beaty Jr. (born 1949), judge of the United States District Court for the Middle District of North Carolina
Justice Beatty (disambiguation)